This is the progression of world record improvements of the 100 metres W40 division of Masters athletics.

Key

References

Masters Athletics 100 m list

Masters athletics world record progressions